This is a list of notable visual artists from, or associated with, Bangladesh.

A
 Zainul Abedin (1914–1976)
 Safiuddin Ahmed (1922–2012)
 Shahabuddin Ahmed (born 1950)
 Monirul Islam (artist) (born 1942)
 Tofail Ahmed (1920–2002)
 Novera Ahmed (1939–2015)
 Mubinul Azim (1934-1975)
 Atia Islam Anne (born 1962)

B
 Murtoza Bashir (1932-2020)
 Kazi Abdul Baset (1935–2002)
 Shishir Bhattacharjee (born 1960)
 Shyamal Bashak (born 1967)
 Nobo Kumar Bhadra (born 1964)

C
 Kanak Chanpa Chakma (born 1963)
 Rashid Choudhury (1932–1986)
 Qayyum Chowdhury (1932–2014)
 Devdas Chakraborty (1933–2008)
 Samarjit Roy Chowdhury (born 1937)

F 
 Firoz Mahmud (born 1974)
 Ferdousi Priyabhashini (1947-2018)
 Fabeha Monir (born 1987)

H
 Mrinal Haque (1958-2020)
 Quamrul Hassan (1921–1988)

I
 Aminul Islam (1931-2011)
 Monirul Islam (born 1942)
 Syful Islam (born 1946)

J
 Syed Jahangir (1935-2018)
 Dilara Begum Jolly (born 1960)

K
 Syed Abdullah Khalid (c. 1942-2017)
 Hashem Khan (born 1941)
 Mohammad Kibria (1929–2011)
 Nitun Kundu (1935–2006)
 Hamiduzzaman Khan (born 1946) 
 Monsur Ul Karim (born 1950)
 Kalidas Karmakar (1946)

M
 Mustafa Manwar (born 1935)
 Mustapha Khalid Palash (born 1963)
 Naeem Mohaiemen (born 1969)
 Mohammad Rakibul Hasan (born 1977)
 Minar Rahman (born 1992)

N
 Rafiqun Nabi (born 1943)

R
 AKM Abdur Rouf (1935–2000)
 Hamidur Rahman (artist) (1928–1988)
 Abdur Razzaque (1932–2005)

S
 Abdus Shakoor (born 1947)
 SM Sultan (1923–1994)
 Shamim Sikder (born 1953)

T
 Tayeba Begum Lipi (born 1969)
 Md Tokon (born 1978)

References

 
Bangladeshi
Artists